José Rodriques de Souza, C.Ss.R. (Paraíba do Sul, 25 March 1926 – Goiânia , 9 September 2012) was the Catholic bishop of the Diocese of Juazeiro, Brazil.

Ordained to the priesthood in 1950, Rodriques de Souza was named bishop in 1975 and retired in 2003.

Notes

20th-century Roman Catholic bishops in Brazil
1926 births
2012 deaths
Redemptorist bishops
People from Paraíba do Sul
21st-century Roman Catholic bishops in Brazil
Roman Catholic bishops of Juazeiro